Sir Charles Walter Michael Court,  (29 September 1911 – 22 December 2007) was a Western Australian politician, and the 21st Premier of Western Australia from 1974 to 1982.  He was a member of the Liberal Party.

Early life
Court's family emigrated from his birthplace Crawley, Sussex, England, to Perth when he was 6 months old. He went to primary school in Leederville, and then to Perth Boys School.  His Salvation Army parents induced him to play the cornet in their Sunday parades and he became a proficient player.  He began formal music training at 12 and became a member of the RSL Memorial Band. He also inherited a strong union background from his father, a plumber, and joined the Musicians Union at the age of 14, playing in annual May Day parades. In 1930 he competed in the national band competition held in Tanunda and won the brass solo competition, the "Champion of Champions".

Court aspired to study law but his parents could not afford the university fees, so while working as a newspaper delivery boy he studied accounting at night school. In 1927 he was articled to a firm of auditors and eventually qualified as an accountant and went into his own practice in 1933. He became a foundation partner of Hendry Rae & Court in 1938, which he remained a partner in until 1970.

Charles Court enlisted in the AMF in September 1940.  He was soon given a commission and sent to the officers' training school in Geelong.  In January 1942 he transferred to the Second Australian Imperial Force (AIF). He joined the First Armoured Division, becoming Deputy Assistant Quartermaster General (DAQMG) and was promoted to captain. He was redeployed to the Northern Territory in 1943 for a brief period.  After further training he was posted to New Guinea in early 1945 as a major, receiving an acting promotion to lieutenant colonel. Most of his service was on Bougainville Island as AQMG with the Second Australian Army Corps, serving under Lt. General Stanley Savige. He was appointed an OBE for his service between April and September 1945, in maintaining and co-ordinating communication and supply lines in the outer islands. See generally Bougainville campaign (1944-45).

Political career
In 1946, Court joined the Liberal Party and stood in 1953 as one of two co-endorsed Liberal candidates in the Perth metropolitan seat of Nedlands. After distribution of preferences, he received 54% of the valid votes.  He would hold this seat for just over 29 years.  He became a member of the opposition until the election of a Liberal government in 1959, and was elevated to cabinet as Minister for Industrial Development under (Sir) David Brand. He held this post until the Liberal-Country Coalition was defeated at the 1971 election. In May 1972, Brand retired as opposition leader for health reasons and was replaced by Court. In 1974, the Liberal-Country Coalition defeated John Tonkin's Labor government and Court became premier.

As minister for industrial development under Brand, Court was the architect of a number of important development initiatives in the Western Australian iron-ore industry, paving the way for the subsequent Western Australian mining boom. He was integral in transforming the state from one which as recently as the 1930s had required special assistance from the Commonwealth Grants Commission, to one which was able to generate substantial income. Court's subsequent eight-year term as premier essentially continued these initiatives and, in particular, his strong promotion of iron-ore mining in the Pilbara region and gas exploration and development on the North West Shelf.

Court was a staunch opponent of Aboriginal land rights, playing a central role in the infamous Noonkanbah land-rights dispute which marked a new low in relations between the government and Aboriginal people. The mining boom had led to hundreds of resource tenements being pegged on the Yungngora people's Noonkanbah pastoral station in the Kimberley, but an anthropological report found the whole area had spiritual significance for the community. Court was adamant that the exploration should go ahead regardless—and a convoy of 45 trucks transporting a drilling rig left Perth, manned by non-union drivers and protected by hundreds of police, on 7 August 1980. Violent confrontations between police and Noonkanbah protesters ensued, culminating in the drilling rigs forcing their way through community picket lines and on to sacred land. The saga has been seen by some commentators as the defining issue of Court's final, unfinished term in office, and a problematic political legacy.

Court was also renowned for his anti-centralist views, being a staunch defender of states' rights against perceived encroaching federal government powers, but also for his support of the Australian flag and the Australian Monarchy. In his maiden speech to parliament in 1953 he referred to a centralist government as "leviathan". Despite his pro-union upbringing, as Premier he was vehemently opposed to trade unions, supporting legislation which prevented gatherings of more than three people in public without police permission in an attempt to prevent the holding of illegal union meetings.

In 1976 Court controversially attempted to close the Tresillian Centre for mentally ill children in his blue-ribbon electorate of Nedlands, after complaints from neighbours. The affair prompted a public outcry which led to the resignation of parliamentary secretary Ray Young, and Court eventually backed down. However, the children were ultimately forced to move to Forrestfield and the centre was sold to the Nedlands Council.

A cause of even greater controversy was Court's decision to close the Perth-Fremantle railway service in 1979. His stated rationale was that buses would do the job better, being cheaper and more flexible. However, it soon emerged that the government intended to build a freeway on part of the rail reserve. A public protest group, "Friends of the Railways", campaigned against the closure in the period before the 1983 election contributing to the defeat of the Liberal government and the immediate reinstatement of the rail service by the succeeding Burke Labor government.

As Premier, Court demonstrated a commitment to arts and culture in Western Australia, overseeing the inauguration of Murdoch University, the restoration of His Majesty's Theatre and the opening of the Art Gallery of Western Australia in 1979 as part of the new Perth Cultural Centre. Court was premier at the time of the state's 150th anniversary celebrations in 1979—commonly known as WAY '79.

In 1982, he resigned from parliament and was succeeded as premier by his deputy, Ray O'Connor.  A few months later, his son Richard succeeded him as the member for Nedlands.  The younger Court would become premier himself, from 1993 to 2001.

Retirement
On 5 October 2006, Sir Charles celebrated turning 95 years old six days earlier. The Prime Minister, John Howard, attended the event at the Perth Convention Centre, amongst several hundred other guests.

Howard said: 
If you think back over the last 50 years, no figure in public life has done more to promote resource development in this state and therefore Australia than Sir Charles Court.

The contribution, through that energy, that he has made to the contemporary wealth of Australia has been enormous.

On 16 April 2007, at the age of 95, Court suffered a minor stroke. Several days later, his son, Richard, advised that his father was recovering but was suffering from some speech difficulties and it was unclear whether any permanent damage had resulted. Charles Court died on 22 December 2007 at his Nedlands home.

Family
His wife Rita Steffanoni was born on 15 June 1911 and they were married on 3 June 1936.  They had five sons: Victor born 13 November 1938, Barrymore ("Barry") born 23 March 1941, Kenneth ("Ken") born 11 December 1943, Richard born 27 September 1947 and Geoffrey born 29 May 1949.

Rita died in 1992 and in 1996 he married, for the second time, to his former nurse Judy.

After winning his father's Nedlands constituency in 1982, Richard Court became the state's twenty sixth Premier from 1993 to 2001.  Barry Court was president of the Pastoralists' and Graziers' Association, married Margaret Smith, and was President of the Liberal Party of Western Australia from 2008 to 2011.

Honours
Court was appointed Officer of the Order of the British Empire (OBE) in 1947, Knight Bachelor in 1972, Knight of the Order of St Michael and St George (KCMG) in 1979, and a Knight of the Order of Australia (AK) in 1982. He received a Centenary Medal in 2001.

In popular culture
Court made a guest appearance in the film Nickel Queen while Minister for Development.

See also
 Court–McPharlin Ministry
 Court Ministry

Notes

References

External links
Charles Court obituary

|-

Premiers of Western Australia
Treasurers of Western Australia
Leaders of the Opposition in Western Australia
Members of the Western Australian Legislative Assembly
Liberal Party of Australia members of the Parliament of Western Australia
20th-century Australian politicians
Australian monarchists
Australian Army personnel of World War II
Australian Army officers
Knights of the Order of Australia
Australian Knights Commander of the Order of St Michael and St George
Australian Knights Bachelor
Australian politicians awarded knighthoods
Australian Officers of the Order of the British Empire
Recipients of the Centenary Medal
British emigrants to Australia
1911 births
2007 deaths